Jacko Eisenberg (born November 30, 1980) is an Israeli singer who won the fourth season of Kochav Nolad, the Israeli version of Pop Idol.

Biography
Eisenberg was born and raised in Netanya, Israel, to Miriam and Robert Eisenberg. When he was 10 years old, his father died of a heart attack. At the age of 13, he started performing at school ceremonies. He graduated from Eldad High School in Netanya and began to play the piano, guitar, drums and bass. He started touring with Jamus, his hip hop band with Guy Eliahu. He was also supporting himself as a waiter and a wedding singer. In 2003, he released the album Sim Tarosh Batsad (Lay Your Head Down) with Jamus.

Eisenberg declined to serve in the Israeli army, declaring himself a pacifist.

In May 2006, his roommate signed him onto Kochav Nolad, where he won top prize on September 7, besting Maya Rotman and Refael Mirila, singing "Ani Meabed Otakh" (Losing You) and "Nirdam Al Hakholot" (Falling Asleep on the Dunes) with Ninet Tayeb.

After Kochav Nolad
After winning the Kochav Nolad title, his remarks about avoiding military service and the release of a song he recorded with Jamus, "Medina Zona, Medina Motsetset" (Whore Country, Blowjob Country), aroused military and public objections. He was unofficially banned from many media outlets and disappeared from the public life.

He returned to the Israeli music business in 2007, releasing "Kashe Li Lo Lehitragesh" (It's Hard Not to be Excited) with Maya Rotman for the fifth season of Kochav Nolad. The song became a big hit in Israel reaching number one in the main charts.

On January 1, 2008, he released an eponymous debut album. The singles from it were "Shar Shar" (Singing), "Tsoreakh" (Screaming) and "Nirdam Al Hakholot". Commercially the album did not succeed, as only 6,000 copies were sold.

After an unsuccessful tour for his debut album, in July 2010, Jacko left Israel and lived in Amsterdam for two years. In June 2012, Eisenberg came back to Israel to restart his career. In the next three years he released three new singles ("Hatchala", "Hafuch Al Hafuch", "Lma At Mechka") which didn't get to air in the local radio stations.

Eisenberg participated in Big Brother VIP (Israeli season 4).

Discography

Albums
with Jamus
Sim Tarosh Badsad (2003)
Balgan Beolam (2008)

solo
Jacko Eisenberg (2008)

Singles
"Kashe Li Lo Lehitragesh'' (2007)
"Shar Shar" (2007)
"Tsoreakh" (2008)
"Nirdam Al Hakholot" (2008)
"Hatchala" (2012)
"Hafuch Al Hafuch" (2014)
"Lma At Mechka" (2015)

References

External links

 

1980 births
21st-century Israeli male singers
Kokhav Nolad winners
Big Brother (franchise) contestants
Living people
People from Netanya